The 2014 NCAA Division I women's soccer championship was the 33rd edition of the tournament. The first round of the tournament began on November 14 and concluded with the College Cup final match at FAU Stadium in Boca Raton, Florida on December 7, 2014. The Florida State Seminoles defeated the Virginia Cavaliers 1–0 in the final to win their first championship.

Format
Since 2001, the NCAA Division I Women's Soccer Tournament, the tournament features 64 teams in a single-elimination tournament. The 64-team tournament draws from a possible field of 332 teams. Of the 64 berths, 31 are allocated to the conference tournament or regular season winners. The remaining 33 berths are supposed to be determined through an at-large process based upon teams' Ratings Percentage Index (RPI) that did not win their conference tournament.

The NCAA Selection Committee names the top sixteen seeds for the tournament for home field hosting through the quarterfinal matches while teams that do not receive a seed are placed in matches to reduce travel. The 16 seeded teams and teams from the same conference cannot play each other in the first-round or second-round.

Seeded teams

Teams

Bracket

Bracket 1

Bracket 2

Bracket 3

Bracket 4

College Cup

Results

First round

Second round

Third round

Quarterfinals

College Cup

References 

NCAA Women's Soccer Championship
NCAA Division I Women's
College sports in Florida
 
NCAA Division I Women's Soccer Tournament
NCAA Division I Women's Soccer Tournament
NCAA Division I Women's Soccer Tournament